Eupithecia nagaii is a moth in the family Geometridae. It is found in Japan.

References

Moths described in 1963
nagaii
Moths of Japan